Men's professional senior golf is for players aged 50 and above. Golf differs from all other sports in having lucrative competitions for this age group. The leading senior tour is the U.S.-based PGA Tour Champions, which was established in 1980 (as the Senior PGA Tour). It has established a roster of five major championships. These events are all played over four rounds, whereas other senior tournaments are generally played over three rounds—only one other current Champions Tour event, the limited-field and season-ending Charles Schwab Cup Championship, is played over four rounds. A golfer's performances can be quite variable from one round to the next, so playing an extra round increases the likelihood that the senior majors will be won by leading players.

In the current order of play, the senior majors are:
The Tradition (Champions Tour major since foundation in 1989) – May
Senior PGA Championship (founded 1937; Champions Tour major since 1980) – May
U.S. Senior Open (Champions Tour major since foundation in 1980) – July
Senior Players Championship (Champions Tour major since foundation in 1983) – June
The Senior Open Championship (often called the "Senior British Open" outside the UK; founded 1987; Champions Tour major since 2003) – July

The Senior PGA Championship, U.S. Senior Open, and Senior Open Championship, have fields of 144 to 156 players and a 36-hole cut. The Tradition and Senior Players Championship have 81 player fields and no 36-hole cut.

The order of play has changed many times during the history of senior golf, especially since 2006:
 In 2006 the U.S. Senior Open, Senior Players Championship, and Senior Open were held in July and were consecutive on the schedule. There was no event in the week after the Senior Players, allowing golfers adequate time to travel to the United Kingdom and acclimate for the Senior Open two weeks later. This gave the Champions Tour a very clear peak period, which is not found on most other tours, including the PGA Tour. The Tradition was the last major on the schedule.
 In 2007 the Senior Players Championship moved to October, two months after The Tradition, to spread the majors over a longer period of time.
 In 2008, the U.S. Senior Open moved to the week after the Senior Open. This once again gave the Champions Tour a clear peak period, with no tournament held between the U.S. Senior Open and The Tradition (a one-week break in 2008, two weeks in 2009). In 2010, there was a regular tournament in the week after the U.S. Senior Open, followed by a one-week break before The Tradition.
The 2011 season saw another significant schedule change. The Tradition moved from late August to early May, becoming the first major of the season. The Senior Players Championship moved from October to the August date vacated by The Tradition.
 In 2012, the order was almost completely reshuffled. The schedule was also greatly compressed, with all five majors now being played in a two-month period:
 The Senior PGA Championship remained at its end of May slot.
 The Tradition moved from early May to mid-June.
 The Senior Players Championship, formerly the last major of the season in August, moved to late June/early July
 The U.S. Senior Open remains the fourth major in schedule order, but is now held in mid-July.
 The Senior Open kept its 2011 date, but due to the other schedule changes is now the final major.

Unlike the mainstream majors, two of the senior majors have title sponsors, and the Senior PGA Championship and Senior Open have presenting sponsors whose names appear after the tournament title. Also unlike the mainstream majors, none of which falls under the direct jurisdiction of any professional tour, the Champions Tour directly operates two of its majors—The Tradition and the Senior Players Championship. The other three senior majors are operated by the same bodies that organize their mainstream counterparts—the PGA of America for the Senior PGA, The R&A for the Senior Open, and the USGA for the U.S. Senior Open.

The Senior PGA is by far the oldest of the senior majors, having commenced in the 1930s. The other four tournaments all date from 1980 or later, having been founded in the era when senior golf became a commercial success. This occurred when the first big golf stars of the television era, men such as Arnold Palmer and Gary Player, began to reach the relevant age.

Unlike mainstream men's golf, the senior game does not have a globally agreed set of majors. The three majors recognized by the European Senior Tour are the Senior PGA Championship and the U.S. and British Senior Opens. However, the Champions Tour is much more dominant in global senior golf than the PGA Tour is in mainstream men's golf.

Senior major winners
The table below show the results of all the events designated as majors by the Champions Tour. As the order in which the majors were played frequently changes, they are listed in the current order of play. Winners of Senior PGA Championships played before 1980 and Senior Opens played before 2003 are not listed here as they were not Champions Tour majors at the time nor retroactively recognized as majors. Those winners are shown in the tournaments' articles. The other three tournaments have been Champions Tour majors throughout their existence. The Senior PGA Championship was held twice in 1984 but was not held in 1983 or 1985.

Bernhard Langer holds the record for the most senior majors won with eleven. Gary Player has also won nine championships that are now considered senior golf majors, but three of his titles came at the Senior Open Championship before this tournament officially gained senior major status. Jack Nicklaus has won eight senior majors and holds the record for the most regular majors won (18).

Bernhard Langer is the only player to have won each of the five senior major championships and is therefore held to have won the 'Career Grand Slam.'  In his time, Nicklaus also held a 'Career Grand Slam' as the Senior Open did not become the fifth senior major until 2003, by which time Nicklaus had effectively retired from senior golf (his only appearance in the Senior Open was in 2003).

By country

Source:

Notes

References